The Basketball Tournament 2015 was the second edition of The Basketball Tournament, a 5-on-5, single elimination basketball tournament. The tournament involved 97 teams; it started on July 10 and continued through August 2, 2015. The winner of the final, Overseas Elite, received a one million dollar prize. The semifinals and championship game, played at Rose Hill Gymnasium at Fordham University in The Bronx, were broadcast on ESPN. The tournament was branded as "The Basketball Tournament Presented by Jack Link's Jerky".

Format
The main tournament field started with 96 teams, organized into four regions of 24 teams each. The 24 teams in each region were 18 teams selected by fans via the tournament's website and six teams selected at-large. Four teams from each region, plus 2014 tournament defending champion Notre Dame Fighting Alumni, qualified to advance to the "Super 17" in Chicago.

The winning team (its players, coaches, general manager, and boosters) received 95% of the $1 million prize, while the remaining 5% was split amongst the team's top 91 fans (based on how many friends they had join the tournament's website).

An online bracket contest awarded $1717 to one fan.

Venues
The Basketball Tournament 2015 took place in five locations.

 2014 champion Notre Dame Fighting Alumni faced the Midwest's lowest remaining seed on July 23; that game's winner, plus the other 15 regional qualifiers, all played on July 24

Bracket

Eight teams in each region received a first-round bye, based on online fan votes.

Source:

Midwest regional

 The 2014 champions, Notre Dame Fighting Alumni, earned an automatic entry in the "Super 17" round, where they faced the lowest remaining seed in the Midwest region, Midwest Dream Squad, on July 23. Notre Dame Fighting Alumni won that game, 79–77, thus advancing in the bracket.

Northeast regional

Three teams withdrew from the tournament—Friar Nation, The Citi Team, and Team Oohway—resulting in forfeit wins for their first-round opponents.

South regional

West regional

Source:

Regional finals

Source:

Semifinals & final

Source:

Awards

MVP: D. J. Kennedy of Overseas Elite

References

Further reading

External links
 TBT Flashback - 2015 Championship Game via YouTube

The Basketball Tournament
2015–16 in American basketball
2015 in sports in California
2015 in sports in Georgia (U.S. state)
2015 in sports in Illinois
2015 in sports in New York City
2015 in sports in Pennsylvania
2015 in Atlanta
2015 in Los Angeles
2015 in Philadelphia
2010s in Chicago
2010s in the Bronx
July 2015 sports events in the United States
August 2015 sports events in the United States
Basketball competitions in New York City
Basketball competitions in Philadelphia
Fordham, Bronx
Basketball competitions in Atlanta
Basketball competitions in Chicago
Basketball competitions in Los Angeles
Sports competitions in Philadelphia